Hiram is an unincorporated community in Preston County, West Virginia, United States.

References 

Unincorporated communities in West Virginia
Unincorporated communities in Preston County, West Virginia